Paper Anniversary may refer to:
A 1st wedding anniversary is referred to as a Paper Anniversary
Paper Anniversary (album), an album by Canadian folk-pop singer Christine Fellows